Biggleswade was a historic 'hundred' of English county of Bedfordshire. The hundred consisted of the town of Biggleswade and its surrounding area. The name Biggleswade comes from a concatenation of the Anglo Saxon words 'Biceil' (being a personal name) and 'Waed' (meaning a ford).

History
Evidence suggests that the area which Biggleswade now occupies was inhabited as early as 10,000 BC. Coins dated to the 1st century BC have also been found, and traced back to the Celtic chief Taseiovanus, who resided in what is now St Albans, Hertfordshire. During the 5th century AD Saxons named the river Ivel and built settlements which evolved into the present day villages of Northill and Southill, to the west of Biggleswade.

The Domesday Survey records the manor of Biggleswade as being governed by Ralph de Insula (Ralph de Lisle), on behalf of the monarch. Later, in the 12th century, Henry I transferred custody of Biggleswade to the Bishop of Lincoln. Successive bishops maintained significant influence until the mid 16th century, when Edward IV obtained direct control over the town and its surrounding area.

In 1785 'the great fire' swept through the town of Biggleswade and destroyed many of its buildings. The subsequent rebuilding effort, along with other factors, encouraged more people to settle in the town, triggering a significant (80%) population growth during the first half of the 19th century. This culminated in 1850, when Biggleswade became the first town in Bedfordshire to gain a mainline train station.

Physical geography
The River Ivel runs along the northern and western boundaries of the town of Biggleswade. The surrounding area is generally flat and open, with the occasional small wooded area. There is some modestly higher ground to the west of the town. The hundred of Biggleswade is located to the south east of Bedford, and to the north of Letchworth. The town is the district of Central Bedfordshire and is the fifth largest town in Bedfordshire after Bedford, Dunstable, Luton and Leighton Buzzard

Social geography
Today, Biggleswade is a largely open area containing both undeveloped and farming land. The town of Biggleswade is steadily growing market town with a strong market gardening presence and a growing light industrial sector. The town is smaller than some other towns and cities in the county (particularly Bedford and Luton), but retains a valuable place in the county's history, and a quiet charm that makes it attractive to visitors. Recent statistics record Biggleswade and the surrounding area as having a population of about 16,100 people (as of 2005). Biggleswade is twinned with the German town of Erlensee.

Transport links
Biggleswade is served by the A1 road, which went right through the heart of the town until a bypass was built in the 1960s.

It is also accessible via rail lines that connect it to London King's Cross, Stevenage and Hitchin to the south and St. Neots, Huntingdon and Peterborough to the north.

Regular local bus services connect Biggleswade with Hitchin, Sandy and Bedford along with less frequent services which connect with smaller towns and villages locally including Letchworth, Shefford, Wrestlingworth, Potton and Gamlingay. Service cutbacks by Stagecoach and funding problems by Bedfordshire County Council have seen the loss of many services to other local towns including Stevenage and Cambridge over the years. Stagecoach who acquired the United Counties Bus Company in November 1987 were the dominant bus operator although other operators have run services including Charles Cook, Whippet, JBS, Buffalo Travel. Following major cutbacks by Stagecoach in 2003, 2005 and 2007, increasing numbers of independent bus operators now run into Biggleswade. These operators include:
 Centrebus who run the 82 to Hitchin
 Herberts Travel operate the local town service and school routes
 J&D Travel operate service E7 to Arlesey and Letchworth
 Grant Palmer operate service 197 to Milton Keynes and 200 to Flitwick
 Meridian Line of Bassingbourn operate E1-E5 which run various routes between Biggleswade, Sandy, Wrestlingworth and Potton amongst other places.

Local amenities
Biggleswade Congregation, Shortmead Street, Biggleswade, Bedfordshire (Jehovah's Witnesses)
Biggleswade Hospital, Elmside Potton Road, Biggleswade, Bedfordshire
Biggleswade Recreation Centre, Eagle Farm Road, Biggleswade, Bedfordshire
Biggleswade Station, Station Road, Biggleswade, Bedfordshire

Parishes
The hundred contained the following parishes:

Astwick, Little Barford, Biggleswade, Cockayne Hatley, Dunton, Edworth, Everton, Eyeworth, Langford, Potton, Sandy, Sutton, Tempsford, Wrestlingworth

See also
 Hundreds of Bedfordshire

References

External links and sources
http://www.BiggleswadeHistory.org.uk
http://www.BiggleswadeTownPlan.org.uk
http://www.biggleswade.org/
https://web.archive.org/web/20110127213653/http://www.biggleswademasterplan.info/
https://web.archive.org/web/20050318224845/http://www.yourtotalevent.com/places/Bedfordshire/biggleswade%20history.htm

Hundreds of Bedfordshire
Biggleswade